Boris Becker defeated Goran Ivanišević 7–6(7–4), 4–6, 7–5 to win the 1993 Qatar ExxonMobil Open singles competition.

Seeds

  Stefan Edberg (semifinals)
  Goran Ivanišević (final)
  Boris Becker (champion)
  Andrei Cherkasov (semifinals)
  Marc Rosset (first round, retired)
  Javier Sánchez (quarterfinals)
  Jan Siemerink (second round)
  Tomás Carbonell (first round)

Draw

Finals

Section 1

Section 2

References

External links
 1993 Qatar Open Main Singles draw

Singles